The 2004 Women's Hockey RaboTrophy was the second edition of the women's field hockey tournament. The RaboTrophy was held in Amsterdam from 26 June to 4 July 2004, and featured four of the top nations in women's field hockey.

The Netherlands won the tournament for the first time, finishing top of the ladder at the conclusion of the pool stage.

The tournament was held in conjunction with the Men's RaboTrophy.

Competition format
The four teams competed in a pool stage, played in a double round robin format. Standings at the conclusion of the pool stage determined final placings.

Teams
The following four teams competed for the title:

Officials
The following umpires were appointed by the International Hockey Federation to officiate the tournament:

 Renée Cohen (NED)
 Jean Duncan (SCO)
 Christiane Hippler (GER)
 Lee Mi-Ok (KOR)
 Hu Youfang (CHN)

Results
All times are local (Central European Time).

Pool

Fixtures

Statistics

Final standings

Goalscorers

References

External links
Official Website

RaboTrophy
Hockey RaboTrophy
Women's Hockey RaboTrophy
Hockey RaboTrophy
Hockey RaboTrophy
Sports competitions in Amstelveen